Rachel (Wacholder) Scott (born 1975) is a model and professional beach volleyball player who won eight beach volleyball championships with three partners. Scott was named Best Defensive Player 2005 and Most Improved Player on the AVP Tour in 2005. By 2009, she had played in 168 beach volleyball events, 121 domestically and 47 internationally, and earned eight victories, 22 runner-up performances, and won over $750,000 in prize money.

Early life
Scott was born in Laguna Beach, California, and is Jewish.  She attended Laguna Beach High School ('93). She was named California High School Volleyball Player of the Year in 1993.

She then attended the University of Colorado and graduated with a degree in Communications.  She started four seasons on the volleyball team where she earned second team All-Big Eight honors in both 1994 and '95 and first-team All-Big 12 honors in 1996, the first season of the new league.  She was a member of the 1993 Big Eight Championship team for the Buffaloes.  She has held 32 records in the Colorado Volleyball record book, including most kills in a three-game match (24) and is the only Buffalo to record 100 attacks in a single match, swinging 106 times against Iowa State in 1996.  She ranks in the top five in CU history in career kills (3rd – 1,484), career attacks (2nd – 4,330), career service aces (t-4th – 145) and career digs (4th – 1,342).

Career

Scott won the most improved player in 2000 on the Beach Volleyball America (BVA) Tour.

Scott won two Fédération Internationale de Volleyball (FIVB) Grand Slam events in 2004, her first two career victories, alongside Olympic gold medal winner Kerri Walsh, filling in for an injured Misty May-Treanor.

In 2005, she had the second-most kills and second-most digs on the Association of Volleyball Professionals (AVP) Tour. At the end of the 2005 season, she was voted the AVP's best defensive player and most improved player of the year.

In 2006, she was the No. 2 seed on the AVP tour along with her partner, beach volleyball veteran Elaine Youngs. During the 2005 AVP tour, Scott and Youngs dealt top-seeded Kerri Walsh and Misty May-Treanor a surprise defeat at the Huntington Beach Open, halting the two-time Olympic Gold Medal winning team's 50-match win streak. She ranked second on the tour in kills (7.71 per game), and seventh in digs (5.17 per game).  The duo would go on to win five events together, all on the AVP Tour with three coming in 2005 and two in 2006.

In August 2006, Scott and Youngs split before the 2006 Manhattan Beach Open. Scott paired with Jen (Kessy) Boss defeated Youngs and new partner Nicole Branagh in their first meeting at the Coney Island Open. In 2007, she was ninth on the tour in digs (5.49 per game). In 2008, she won the  San Diego AVP Open with partner Tyra Turner.

By 2009, Scott had played in 168 beach volleyball events, 121 domestically and 47 internationally.  She earned eight victories, 22 runner-up performances, and won over $750,000 in prize money.

It was reported in 2009 that she would play with Kerri Walsh at the Hermosa Beach Open and continue for the rest of the season together with Walsh.  The duo played in four events, finishing third once, fifth twice and 13th once. In 2010, she reunited with Youngs and the duo, seeded third, finished fifth to open the season at the Fort Lauderdale, Florida AVP event.

Personal life
Scott resides in Redondo Beach, California with husband Sean Scott, whom she wed in November 2007. Her husband is a beach volleyball player on the AVP Tour.

Honors
In 2006 she was inducted into the Southern California Jewish Sports Hall of Fame.

References

External links 
 Rachel Wacholder at the Association of Volleyball Professionals (archived)
 
 

1975 births
Living people
American women's beach volleyball players
People from Laguna Beach, California
Sportspeople from Redondo Beach, California
Jewish American sportspeople
Jewish women's volleyball players
21st-century American Jews
21st-century American women
Colorado Buffaloes women's volleyball players